Adams Township is one of thirty-seven townships in La Salle County, Illinois, USA.  As of the 2020 census, it had a population of 1,619.

Geography

Cities, towns, villages
 Leland

Unincorporated towns
 Baker at 
(This list is based on USGS data and may include former settlements.)

Cemeteries
The township contains these four cemeteries: Baker, Little Indian Creek, Pierce Family and Saint Clara Catholic.

Demographics
As of the 2020 census, there were 1,619 people, 772 households, and 569 families residing in the township. The racial makeup of the village was 89.93% White, 0.21%, 0.2% African American, 0.1% Native American, 0.6% Asian, 2.3% from other races, and 6.9% from two or more races. Hispanic or Latino of any race were 7.4% of the population.

There were 7,764 households, out of which 32.5% had children under the age of 18 living with them, 49.1% were married couples living together, 20.4% had a female householder with no husband present, and 26.3% were non-families. 20.5% of all households were made up of individuals, and 7.0% had someone living alone who was 65 years of age or older. The average household size was 2.41 and the average family size was 2.67.

In the township, the population was spread out, with 21.6% under the age of 18, 6.9% from 18 to 24, 30.2% from 25 to 44, 27.3% from 45 to 64, and 14.0% who were 65 years of age or older. The median age was 38.5 years. For every 100 females, there were 89.0 males. For every 100 females age 18 and over, there were 83.4 males.

The median income for a household in the township was $52,500, and the median income for a family was $60,048. Males had a median income of $45,069 versus $18,375 for females. The per capita income for the township was $24,315. 22.5% of families and 26.5% of the population were living below the poverty line, including 37.1% of those under eighteen and 1.1% of those over 65.

School districts
 Community Unit School District 2
 Leland Community Unit School District 1
 Somonauk Community Unit School District 432

Political districts
 Illinois's 11th congressional district
 State House District 70
 State Senate District 35

References
 
 United States Census Bureau 2009 TIGER/Line Shapefiles
 United States National Atlas

External links
 City-Data.com
 Illinois State Archives
 Township Officials of Illinois

Townships in LaSalle County, Illinois
Populated places established in 1849
Townships in Illinois
1849 establishments in Illinois